Vedi is the sacrificial altar in the Vedic religion. Such altars were an elevated outdoor enclosure, generally strewed with Kusha grass, and having receptacles for the sacrificial fire; it was of various shapes, but usually narrow in the middle.

They were used in various types of Yajna rituals, of which the lengthiest was the agnicayana, lasting twelve days.  In Vedic times, offerings, often including animals, were burnt in the fire, and fully consumed by it.  This contrasts with modern Hindu offerings to gods, which are all vegetable, and are preserved to be consumed by the devotees (which was also the case in other religions, such as ancient Greek religion).

Fire altars remain part of the rituals in some Hindu festivals and rites of passage; in particular circling around a sacred fire (saptapadi) remains an essential part of Hindu weddings.

Although Agni, the Vedic god of fire, has an important place in the mandala setting out the plan in Hindu temple architecture, in the south-east part of the temple, fire altars are not now a normal part of regular Hindu temple rituals.  Modern fire sacrifices are covered at Homa rituals.

Types

As deduced from descriptions in ancient texts, the types of vedi were:
, the great or entire altar
, the northern altar made for the sacred fire 
, a sort of subordinate or side-altar, generally a heap of earth covered with sand on which the fire is placed
, an altar shaped like a trough (Shulbas. 3.216)
, a second altar at the Soma sacrifice

The  was in the shape of a falcon ( 'piled up in the shape of the bird Alaja'), and was piled up with bricks in the Agnicayana ritual.

Vedic altars are described in the circum-Vedic texts dealing with Kalpa (the proper performance of sacrifice), notably the Satapatha Brahmana, and the Sulbasutras say that the Rigveda corresponds to an altar of mantras.

Fire altars are already mentioned in the Rigveda. According to Taittiriya Samhita 5.2.3., they are made of twenty-one bricks.

ŚBM 10.3.1. describes that the altar is symbolically built with gayatri (24 syllables),  (breath, 28 syllables),  (mind, 40 syllables), tristubh (ear, 44 syllables),  (awakening) (48 syllables) and generative breath. The  altar's height is to the knees, the 's to the navel and the 's to a man's height.

Agnicayana 

The round  and the square  have the same area. The Squaring the circle problem was also investigated because of such ritualistic considerations. The  altar has five layers, representing earth, space and the sky.

Archaeology 
At Kalibangan (at the Ghaggar river) the remains of what some writers claim to be fire altars have been unearthed. S.R. Rao found similar "fire altars" in Lothal which he thinks could have served no other purpose than a ritualistic one.

See also
Agiary
Yajna

Notes

References 
Subhash Kak. Birth and Early Development of Indian Astronomy. In Astronomy across cultures: The History of Non-Western Astronomy, Helaine Selin (ed), Kluwer, 2000
Subhash Kak, The Astronomical Code of the Rigveda, Delhi, Munshiram Manoharlal, 2000, .
Sen, S.N., and A.K. Bag. 1983. The Sulbasutras. New Delhi: Indian National Science Academy.
Frits Staal, Agni, the Vedic ritual of the fire altar (1983).

External links

http://ccat.sas.upenn.edu/george/vedi.html

Vedas
Hindu architecture
Hindu temple architecture
Altars
Yajna